"Focus" is a song recorded by American singer Ariana Grande. It was released on November 2, 2015, by Republic Records written by Grande, Savan Kotecha, Peter Svensson and its producers Ilya Salmanzadeh and Max Martin, and features horns with cowbells and handclaps as percussion. Originally intended to be the lead single off of Grande's third studio album, the song was scrapped and replaced by its title track and consequently removed from the album's standard edition. It was instead released on the Japanese edition of the album. 

The song received mixed reviews from music critics who praised Grande's vocals and the song's brassy production but criticized its similarity to her 2014 hit "Problem". "Focus" debuted at number seven on the Billboard Hot 100 chart with 113,000 downloads in its first week. It was Grande's sixth top-ten single, and her first unaccompanied by another artist. The song also reached the top ten in Canada, Australia, Greece, Italy, Spain and the United Kingdom. By January 2016, "Focus" sold 544,000 copies in the United States and was certified double Platinum by the RIAA. It is also certified Diamond in Brazil.

Its music video, directed by Hannah Lux Davis, premiered on October 30, 2015 on Grande's Vevo channel. Until 2019, it remained the fourth most viewed music video on Grande's YouTube channel. She performed "Focus" at the 2015 American Music Awards and at the iHeartRadio Theater Los Angeles concert, and it was on the set list of the second leg of Grande's 2017 Dangerous Woman Tour.

Background and release
"Focus" was written by Grande, Savan Kotecha, Peter Svensson and its producers, Ilya Salmanzadeh and Max Martin. Serban Ghenea mixed the song, aided by John Hands. Grande began working on a new material for her third studio album in May 2015, posting details about the project on social media and in conversations with the public. The album was originally entitled Moonlight. The singer posted an unfocused picture of herself on her Instagram page in July 2015 with the caption "Focus", calling it a "hint". A video released in September 2015 by iHeartMedia Music Summit demonstrated that Grande, Republic Records CEO Monte Lipman and her manager, Charlie Walk, played the song to the approval of the Republic Records staff.

Grande announced the single during her September 15, 2015 appearance on The Tonight Show Starring Jimmy Fallon, with a release date of October 30. She began posting snippets of the song's lyrics, video and audio previews and pixelated versions of the single's cover in early October on Instagram and Twitter, and unveiled "Focus"' cover art on October 14. A week before the song's release date, A 15-second snippet of the track was used in a commercial for Ari by Ariana Grande, the singer's debut fragrance. "Focus" was digitally released worldwide on October 30, 2015, and was added to hot adult contemporary playlists in the United States on November 2. It was later released to American and Italian contemporary hit radio stations on November 3 and 6 respectively. "Focus" was released as a maxi single in Japan on December 4, with regular version containing a mini-calendar and a mini-poster, whilst deluxe edition containing a poster and an A7-sized notebook.

Removal from Dangerous Woman 
The song was originally intended to be the lead single of Grande's then-unnamed third studio album. Republic Records later told Billboard that the track had been removed from the album's standard edition and that the lead single will be changed to "Dangerous Woman". The song was moved to the album's Japan edition as a bonus track. Vulture editor Dee Locket explained that "Focus" was not included on the album's final cut because the song's rollout was not "remembered as a success – it was calculated to a fault, too polished for a time when pop's biggest stars, particularly its women, were letting their flaws bleed into the music."

Music and lyrics

According to sheet music published by Kobalt Music on Musicnotes.com, "Focus" was written in the key of G minor and set in  time at a moderate tempo of 100 beats per minute. Grande's voice ranges from C4 to G5. A retro-styled song, "Focus" is based on a 1970s-inspired dance beat. According to Ryan Reed of Rolling Stone, its instrumentation features "stabbing big-band brass" (with saxophone, trumpet and a trombone), smooth synths and clanging percussion with synthesized handclaps and a cowbell. The song's horn foundation has been compared to Grande's 2014 single, "Problem" (featuring Australian rapper Iggy Azalea) from her album, My Everything. In an Entertainment Tonight  interview, Grande acknowledged "Focus"' similarity to "Problem"; she thought the former would be the "perfect transition record" from her last album to her new album, because it sounds like "Problem 2.0".

Lyrically, Grande asks for attention and focus. According to Idolators Robbie Daw, the pre-chorus resembles the intro of KC and the Sunshine Band's 1975 disco song, "That's the Way (I Like It)". Marcus Floyd of Renowned for Sound wrote that in the second verse, Grande "addresses her haters and insists that they address her realness". Its "funky" chorus consists of the repeated phrase, "Focus on me", sung by American actor Jamie Foxx in a bass voice. Grande explained the hook:

When I say, "Focus on me", I'm not asking to be the center of attention. I'm not asking you to focus on my face or my clothes or my body or my singing voice. By "focus on me", I literally mean focus on me. Focus on what I'm all about and what I believe in. The more we focus on each other as people and not on what we look like, what we're wearing, our gender, our hairstyle, our sexuality, the color of our skin. But focus on each other on a soul level. The more we realize how much we have in common, the more we listen to each other, the more one we become.

Critical reception
Amy Davison from Digital Spy praised "Focus"' "sax-driven" beat; The Verge Kaitlyn Tiffany called Grande a "massively talented vocalist", and "Focus" a "very pleasant" listen. Times Nolan Feeney noted that although it was similar to "Problem", it may not have been a poor single decision. On Renowned for Sound, Marcus Floyd called "Focus" predictably "catchy and attention grabbing"; the song ticks "all the boxes of an effective lead single." Giving it four out of five stars, he wrote that "Focus" is one of Grande's "stronger single releases" to date but did not "venture out" of her "comfort zone." Steven J. Horowitz of Billboard gave the song two-and-a-half out of five stars and wrote that Grande had never released a "less-than-great" single until "Focus", which he considered a "weak" rehash of "Problem".

Time called "Focus" the sixth-worst song of 2015, calling Grande's vocal "dwarfed" by "too-big instrumentals" as it had been on "Problem" and "Break Free"; however, the latter two had a "sustaining energy" which "Focus" lacked. The singer needed a "tightly constructed, elegant hit" after her 2015 doughnut controversy, "and this isn't it". Although Brennan Carley of Spin called the song a "catchy slow-burn" and a "horn heavy piece of retro-modern fusion", Grande's vocals lacked "real excitement from a star who's got the restraint and skill to take her instrument places most other pop singers can't anymore." Carley criticized the song's "male howling" for "[getting] grating quickly" and making "Focus" too similar to "Problem".

Year-end lists

Commercial performance
"Focus" debuted at number seven on the Billboard Hot 100 in the United States, selling 113,000 digital downloads in its first full week, becoming Grande's sixth top-ten single and fourth top-ten debut on the chart. It was her first solo top ten in the country, unaccompanied by another artist. The song entered the Digital Songs chart at number five and was number 13 on the Streaming Songs chart, with 13.3 million domestic streams. It fell to number 13 in its second week on the Hot 100, rebounding to number 12 in its third week following Grande's performance at the 2015 American Music Awards. By April 2018, "Focus" sold over 544,000 digital downloads in the US and was certified double Platinum by the RIAA. It debuted and peaked at number eight on the Canadian Hot 100, Grande's fifth Canadian top-ten single.

The song debuted at number ten on the Official Singles Chart in the United Kingdom, Grande's third top ten after the number-one singles "Problem" and "Bang Bang". In its second week, the song fell fourteen positions placing at number 24; it spent a total of 14 weeks on the charts. "Focus" also reached the top ten in Australia, Austria, Greece, Italy, the Netherlands and Spain.

Music video
Background and synopsis

The music video for "Focus" was released on YouTube on October 29, 2015. Hannah Lux Davis, who directed the video, also directed the music videos for Grande's "Love Me Harder" and the singer's joint single, "Bang Bang". The video features the Samsung Galaxy Note 5.

The video begins with Grande texting the phrase "focus on me" on a cell phone. During the first verse, scenes of Grande lip-syncing the song are intercut with silhouettes of the singer dancing in a purple circle. She then performs a choreographed routine with six backing dancers on a purple set. During the second verse, she smiles and poses in a square wearing a black mini dress and high Toni Basil-style boots. For the song's bridge, the singer (in a star-print leotard, photographed in black-and-white) lies on a neon-lit set, plays a trumpet and performs with her dancers. The video ends with her right eye illuminated. Teen Vogues Ella Cerón noted its "slightly throwback" visuals, which match the song.

Reception
Sean Fitz-Gerald of Vulture called the video's geometric look similar to the videos for Drake's "Hotline Bling" (2015) and Lil Mama's "Lip Gloss" (2007). Billboards staff ranked the music video for "Focus" as Grande's seventh-best, describing it as "out-of-this-world" with "star-emblazoned jumpsuits and neon wigs"; they compared the clip's aesthetic to the Disney Channel Original Movie Zenon: Girl of the 21st Century (1999) and Grande's dancing to Beyoncé's in the video for "Single Ladies (Put a Ring on It)" (2008). The music video has received over 920 million views on YouTube, becoming her sixth most-viewed upload on the site.

Live performances
Prior to the release of "Focus", Grande started teasing snippets of the song during the last shows of The Honeymoon Tour in October 2015. Grande performed "Focus" live for the first time on the Honda Stage at the iHeartRadio Theater in Los Angeles on October 30, 2015. She also performed the song at the 2015 American Music Awards on November 22, ranked by Billboard as the best performance of the night. According to Bruna Nessif of E!, Grande brought some "old Hollywood glamour" to the performance. Grande performed "Focus" and a cover of ”Merry Christmas (War is Over)” on Disney's Christmas Day special. The song was also performed on the Dangerous Woman Tour in 2017 starting with the second leg in Europe.

Track listingDigital download 
 "Focus" – 3:31Japanese CD maxi single "Focus" – 3:31
 "Focus" (karaoke version) – 3:31
 "Message in Japanese from Ariana" – 0:40

Other Versions
 7th Heaven Club Mix - 6:20
 7th Heaven Radio Edit - 4:15

Credits and personnel
Credits adapted from the liner notes of the "Focus" CD single.RecordingRecorded at MXM Studios, Los Angeles, United States and Wolf Cousins Studios, Stockholm, Sweden
Mixed at MixStar Studios, Virginia Beach, United States
Mastered at Sterling Sound, New York City, United StatesManagementAll rights administered by MXM (administered by Kobalt), Wolf Cousins (STIM), Warner Chappel Music Scand (STIM), Universal Music Corp./GRANDARIMUSIC (ASCAP)PersonnelAriana Grande – lead vocals, songwriter
Savan Kotecha – songwriter, background vocals
Max Martin – songwriter, producer, programming
Ilya Salmanzadeh – songwriter, producer, guitar, bass, keyboards, programming, background vocals
Jonas Thander – horn arrangement, saxophone
Steffan Findin – trombone
Stefan Persson – trumpet
 – trumpet
Peter Carlsson – percussion
Peter Svensson – bass
Jamie Foxx – uncredited vocals
Sam Holland – recording
Serban Ghenea – mixing
Tom Coyne – mastering
John Hanes - mixing assistantPhotographer'
Alfredo Flores

Charts

Weekly charts

Year-end charts

Certifications and sales

Release history

See also
 List of Billboard Hot 100 top-ten singles in 2015
 List of UK top-ten singles in 2015

References

2015 singles
2015 songs
Ariana Grande songs
Music videos directed by Hannah Lux Davis
Republic Records singles
Song recordings produced by Ilya Salmanzadeh
Song recordings produced by Max Martin
Songs written by Ariana Grande
Songs written by Ilya Salmanzadeh
Songs written by Peter Svensson
Songs written by Savan Kotecha